Charles Desmond Davies (born June 25, 1986) is an American former professional soccer player who played as a forward.

Davies set several soccer records at his high school, the Brooks School, before appearing for the Boston College Eagles and the Westchester Flames in college. Davies signed his first professional contract with Swedish Allsvenskan club Hammarby IF in December 2006 before joining Sochaux in July 2009.

Davies was capped seventeen times for the United States national team between 2007 and 2009, and scored four international goals.

On October 13, 2009, Davies was involved in a serious car crash on the George Washington Parkway that killed a fellow passenger and left Davies with severe injuries that kept him out of the 2010 World Cup, and effectively ended his international career.

Youth and college 
Born in New Hampshire, as a child Davies was encouraged to play soccer and coached by his father Kofi Davies, an immigrant from the Gambia. He attended the Brooks School in North Andover, Massachusetts and graduated in 2004 alongside fellow professional Mike Fucito. While there he set many Brooks scoring records, scoring twenty-nine and thirty goals in his junior and senior seasons, respectively. In his senior campaign, Davies led Brooks School to a 15–0 league record, and New England Class-A Championship. Davies also starred in wrestling at Brooks, a 3x New England Prep School Champion while earning National Prep All-American status his sophomore & senior seasons.

After prep school Davies attended Boston College, where he starred for the Eagles for three seasons. His sophomore season was cut short due a knee injury suffered in the first half of the season opener. During his college years he also played with Westchester Flames of the USL Premier Development League, scoring six goals in nine appearances. He was a finalist for the Hermann Trophy in 2006, capping his comeback season. He finished his college career with twenty-four goals and ten assists in thirty-seven games, including fifteen goals in sixteen games his final season.

Professional career 
Rather than finishing his degree at Boston College, Davies decided to turn pro after three years of college. He was a well-established professional prospect, and was expected to be a very high MLS draft pick had he chosen to accept the Generation Adidas contract that he was offered. Ultimately, Davies decided to sign with Nike and try his luck in Europe rather than signing with Major League Soccer.

Hammarby 
After an unsuccessful trial at Dutch club Ajax, Davies signed his first professional contract with Allsvenskan club Hammarby IF in December 2006. Although he initially was placed in the starting lineup, he had trouble finishing and spent his first year with the club alternating between being a starter and a substitute. On June 24, 2007, Davies netted his first goal for the club, which was the decisive goal in Hammarby's match against Faroese club Klaksvik in the first round of the 2007 Intertoto Cup, but he was still unable to score in the Allsvenskan. Davies credits both his coach, Tony Gustavsson, and Uruguayan star and former Hammarby teammate Sebastián Eguren with guiding his work ethic and attitude through his struggles. In the final match of the 2007 season Davies broke through and scored a hat-trick against GAIS.

The 2008 season was a major breakthrough for Davies. He scored fourteen goals in twenty-seven games, twenty-five of which were starts. As a result of his strong performance in 2008 there were many rumors regarding his transfer to a larger club elsewhere in Europe, but ultimately nothing materialized, and Davies returned to Hammarby.

The 2009 season began well for Davies, who scored four goals in the first nine league games. He also scored two extra time goals in a 2009 Swedish Cup match against Åtvidaberg, a ninety-ninth-minute equalizer and the winning goal just before extra time expired, to propel his club to a 3–2 victory in the third round of the tournament.

In the ninth league match of the season, however, he was issued a five match suspension after he  elbowed one of his opponents, Örebro defender Michael Almebäck in the face, resulting in a bloody mouth. Davies subsequently left Sweden to join up with the U.S. national team, marking his last appearance with Hammarby.

Sochaux 
On July 10, 2009, before returning from his suspension in Sweden, it was announced that Davies would sign with Ligue 1 club Sochaux. On August 15, in his second game with Sochaux, Davies came on as a second-half substitute and scored twice; Sochaux ultimately lost the game to Bordeaux, 3–2. However, after only eight appearances with the club, Davies was seriously injured in a car crash while in the United States. On April 26, 2010, Davies returned to full training with his club and was finally placed in the gameday roster for the December 19 match against Bordeaux.

After having spent 2011 on loan to D.C. United, Davies returned to Sochaux. He made his first appearance since his accident in a 1–0 loss against Rennes on February 11, 2012.

D.C. United 
After a ten-day evaluation period with the club during their pre-season, Davies signed on loan with D.C. United for the 2011 MLS season. Davies made his debut as a substitute in the 52nd minute, against the Columbus Crew on March 19, 2011 scoring two goals. A week later he scored his third goal in a 2–1 loss against New England, and, as of May 4, led MLS in scoring with six goals scored. On June 24, Davies was fined $1000 for diving.  On September 11, Davies scored a hat-trick off of three assists from Chris Pontius to beat Chivas USA 3–0 in California.  The win put United into tenth place in the standings, the final playoff spot, just above the New York Red Bulls. United announced on December 1, 2011 that they would not exercise its December 1 option to secure  his permanent transfer from Sochaux. After his loan spell at D.C. United, Davies spoke out about the club's disappointing season and said he was involved in a disagreement with the club's coaching staff.

Randers 
At the end of the season, Davies was on the verge of leaving Sochaux after reaching an agreement to terminate the contract with rumors spreading that he was on his way to join AZ and American team-mate Jozy Altidore but this was denied by technical director Earnie Stewart, who insisted that the club had no interest in Davies. Eventually, Davies signed for Danish side Randers on a two-year deal. Davies made his debut for the club, coming on as a substitute, in a 1–0 win over OB on July 22, 2012. He since has yet to make his first start in the league, having played in the third round of Danish Cup in a 2–1 win over Næstved and finished his time there without scoring a goal.

New England Revolution 
On August 8, 2013, Davies was loaned to the New England Revolution for the remainder of the 2013 MLS season. In early 2014, Davies and Randers agreed to terminate his contract, allowing him to join New England on a permanent basis.

Davies was a key part of New England's run to the MLS Cup final in 2014, scoring multiple goals against the Columbus Crew and New York Red Bulls, including the decisive goal in Leg 2 against the Red Bulls that gave New England an aggregate victory of 4–3.

At the conclusion of the 2015 MLS season, Davies was named the Midnight Riders Man of the Year after scoring 10 goals for the Revolution.

Philadelphia Union 
On August 3, 2016, New England traded Davies and a third-round pick in the 2018 MLS SuperDraft to Philadelphia Union in exchange for a first-round pick in the 2018 SuperDraft, general allocation money, and targeted allocation money.

Davies was waived from the Union at the conclusion of the 2017 season.

Davies announced his retirement from playing soccer on March 2, 2018.

International

Youth 
Davies played ten games, mostly as a substitute, for the United States U-20 men's national soccer team, but did not make the roster for the 2005 FIFA World Youth Championship. He was the last player cut from the Youth Championship roster. However, the U-20 team would include him in the roster for the Elite Milk Cup competition a month later. He led the team to the final where he scored a hat trick, making him the MVP of the competition and giving the U.S. its first Milk Cup success. Davies next focused on the under-23 national team as his next target for international play. He later trained and played with the team, eventually making the roster for the men's tournament at the 2008 Summer Olympics. As a member of the United States men's Olympic team he made only one appearance in the three games the United States team played at the Olympics. He came on as a substitute in the team's last match against Nigeria, where he nearly tied the match when his header rang off the crossbar in the waning moments, which would have sent the team through to the knockout rounds had it gone into the net.

Senior 
He made his debut for the senior national team on June 2, 2007, as a substitute in a 4–1 friendly victory over China in San Jose, California. Later that summer he was a part of the squad that took part in the 2007 Copa América in Venezuela. On October 15, 2008, he scored his first national team goal in a 2–1 loss to Trinidad and Tobago during the third round of CONCACAF qualifying for the 2010 FIFA World Cup. He added his second national team goal against Egypt in the final group stage game of the 2009 Confederations Cup. In the following game against Spain, Davies was involved in his strike partner Jozy Altidore's opening goal. On August 12, 2009, Davies scored the opening goal in a 2–1 loss to Mexico in Mexico City, becoming only the fourth American to score against Mexico in the Azteca Stadium.

Davies was left off the U.S. roster for the 2010 FIFA World Cup after he was not cleared medically by his French club team, Sochaux.

Personal life and health problems

Automobile crash 
On October 13, 2009, Davies, who was in Washington, D.C. for a World Cup Qualifier game against Costa Rica, was a passenger in an SUV that went out of control on the George Washington Parkway and struck a metal railing at about 3:15 a.m., tearing the vehicle in half. The crash shut down the George Washington Parkway until 8:15 a.m. that morning. The crash killed a 22-year-old woman who was in the car with Davies, while Davies himself suffered a lacerated bladder, fractured right tibia and femur, a fractured elbow, multiple facial fractures, and bleeding on the brain. In an interview with ESPN's Jeremy Schaap on December 4, Davies said that he expected to be running by March and would be fit to play at the World Cup. On January 25, 2010, ESPNsoccernet reported Davies was jogging and hoped to return to Sochaux by April. Davies returned to France to complete his rehabilitation with his club on February 17, 2010, with plans to commence full team training within a month. He resumed light training with the club on March 22. On May 11, it was announced by coach Bob Bradley that Davies would not be on the preliminary national team roster for the 2010 FIFA World Cup, as Sochaux had not cleared him medically.

Two years after the crash Davies filed a $20 million lawsuit against Das Enterprises, which operates the Shadow Room, and Red Bull North America, which hosted the private event at which alcohol was served. The parents of the woman killed in the crash also filed suit against the nightclub owner and Red Bull in U.S. District Court in Alexandria, Virginia.

Cancer diagnosis
In the Spring of 2016, Davies was diagnosed with liposarcoma.

Career statistics

Club 
Statistics accurate as of 22 December 2021.

International 
International goals

References

External links
 
 
 
 

                   

1986 births
Living people
Sportspeople from Manchester, New Hampshire
African-American soccer players
Association football forwards
American soccer players
Boston College Eagles men's soccer players
Westchester Flames players
Hammarby Fotboll players
FC Sochaux-Montbéliard players
D.C. United players
Randers FC players
New England Revolution players
Philadelphia Union players
Philadelphia Union II players
USL League Two players
Allsvenskan players
Ligue 1 players
Major League Soccer players
Danish Superliga players
USL Championship players
American expatriate soccer players
Expatriate footballers in Sweden
Olympic soccer players of the United States
United States men's international soccer players
2007 Copa América players
Footballers at the 2008 Summer Olympics
2009 FIFA Confederations Cup players
2009 CONCACAF Gold Cup players
Expatriate footballers in France
Expatriate men's footballers in Denmark
Soccer players from New Hampshire
American people of Gambian descent
American sportspeople of African descent
Sportspeople of Gambian descent
United States men's under-20 international soccer players
United States men's under-23 international soccer players
Brooks School alumni
All-American men's college soccer players
21st-century African-American sportspeople
20th-century African-American people